Sunrise is an unincorporated community in Sunrise Township, Chisago County, Minnesota, United States. The community is located east-northeast of North Branch at the junction of Chisago County Road 9 and River Road. The Sunrise River flows through the community. Nearby places include North Branch, Harris, and Almelund. ZIP codes 55056 (North Branch) and 55032 (Harris) meet near Sunrise.

History
The first settlement was made at Sunrise circa 1853. The name Sunrise is an English translation of the native Ojibwe language name. Sunrise contained a post office from 1856 until 1954.

Notable people
 Jerald C. Anderson, dentist and Minnesota State Senator was born in Sunrise.
 Frank Orren Lowden, Governor of Illinois, was born in Sunrise.
 Richard Widmark, actor, was born in Sunrise.

References

Unincorporated communities in Chisago County, Minnesota
Unincorporated communities in Minnesota